Dog Days is a 1925 short silent comedy film directed by Robert F. McGowan. It was the 36th Our Gang short subject released.

Plot
The boys are showing off their dogs to each other when little rich girl Mary Kornman rides by in her pony-drawn cart. When the pony shies and runs away, Mickey comes to the rescue with his dog. In gratitude, Mary invites all the boys and their dogs to her party, much to the chagrin of her wealthy mother (Lyle Tayo).

Cast

The Gang
 Joe Cobb – Joe
 Jackie Condon – Jackie
 Mickey Daniels – Mickey
 Allen Hoskins – Farina
 Eugene Jackson – Pineapple
 Mary Kornman – Mary
 Pal the Dog – Himself

Additional cast
 Johnny Downs – boy at party
 Peggy Ahern – girl at party
 Ivadell Carter – girl at party
 William Gillespie – Mary's father
 Joseph Morrison – butler
 Lyle Tayo – mother
 Dorothy Vernon – Mickey's mother

References

External links

1925 films
American silent short films
American black-and-white films
Films directed by Robert F. McGowan
Hal Roach Studios short films
1925 comedy films
Our Gang films
1925 short films
1920s American films
Silent American comedy films
1920s English-language films